Daly Waters  is a town and locality in the Northern Territory of Australia, located about  south of the territory capital of Darwin  at the intersection of the Carpentaria Highway and the Stuart Highway.

The area's traditional owners, the Jingili people, believe the Dreaming tracks of the Emu and the Sun travelled through here on their way to the southern parts of the Northern Territory.

History
The name Daly Waters was given to a series of natural springs by John McDouall Stuart during his third attempt to cross Australia from south to north, in 1861–62. Stuart named the springs after the new Governor of South Australia, Sir Dominick Daly.

Stuart's first attempt, in 1860, had reached Tennant Creek. The second, in early 1861, pushed further north but again Stuart turned back. The third journey left Adelaide in October 1861 and reached Daly Waters on 28 May. The party had been pushing through difficult lancewood scrub and harsh terrain at a little over a kilometre a day. This journey was successful, reaching the north coast near modern Darwin on 24 July 1862. Stuart's Tree has an 'S' carved into it by Stuart during his journey.

The Overland Telegraph Line reached Daly Waters from the north in June 1872 and for two months a 'pony express' carried messages the 421 km to Tennant Creek via Renner Springs.

Daly Waters Airfield was a centre for the London to Sydney air race of 1926, a refuelling stop for early Qantas flights to Singapore, a World War II Airforce base, including a field hospital, and more recently an operational base for joint military manoeuvres. Although the aerodrome was closed to commercial traffic in 1969, the original Qantas hangar still stands, housing exhibits of photographs and equipment from the area's aviation past.

The Federal Court of Australia had a special ceremonial sitting on nearby Newcastle Waters Station to commemorate the occasion.

Trivia
The main attraction for tourists is the famous pub, which is decorated throughout with banknotes and other memorabilia left by visitors from every corner of the globe. The historic pub was licensed in 1938 to service passengers and crew from the nearby airfield.

Other services are available at the Hi-Way Inn roadhouse, at the junction of the Carpentaria Highway.

Gallery

Climate 
Daly Waters has a hot semi-arid climate (Köppen BSh) with two distinct seasons. There is a sweltering, humid and extremely uncomfortable wet season from November to March and a hot, generally rainless dry season from April to October. In the wet season roads are frequently closed by heavy rainfall, which has exceeded  in a day from tropical rain depressions on several occasions, whilst heat discomfort is extreme as wet bulb temperatures average  on typical January and February afternoons. Temperatures actually peak just before the wet season begins in October and November at around  but discomfort is less extreme due to lower humidity. In the dry season, cloudless skies and comfortable morning temperatures make for much more pleasant conditions.

References

External links

SMH Travel

Towns in the Northern Territory